The Women's 10 m synchro platform competition of the 2020 European Aquatics Championships was held on 14 May 2021.

Results
The final was started at 19:30.

References

Women's 10 m synchro platform